Nicholas M. Fisk     (born 12 September 1956) is an Australian maternal-fetal medicine specialist, academic and researcher.  As an obstetrician, Fisk is known for inventing the natural caesarean operation, also referred to as the family centred caesarean section.

He has pioneered advances in understanding fetoplacental disease and its treatment, including characterising early human fetal stem cell populations, documenting “fetal pain” and its blockade by opioid analgesia, and unravelling the vascular basis of twin-to-twin transfusion syndrome. In 2016 he was appointed as Deputy Vice-Chancellor (Research) at the University of New South Wales (UNSW Sydney).

Early life and career 

Nicholas Fisk was educated at St Ignatius College Riverview, the University of Sydney (MBBS 1980), University College London (PhD 1992) and Imperial College London (MBA 2008). Fisk was Professor of Obstetrics & Fetal Medicine (1992-2007) at Queen Charlotte's Hospital and Imperial College London, where his laboratory and clinical research program achieved an international reputation in fetal diagnosis and treatment.

He returned to Australia in 2008 as the inaugural Director of the Centre for Clinical Research at the University of Queensland, where between 2010-2016 he served as Executive Dean of the Faculties of Health, Medicine and Biomedical Sciences. From 2000-2001 he was President of the International Fetal Medicine and Surgery Society and from 2016-2020 Chair of the Association for Academic Health Centers International (AAHCI Steering Committee). He was elected to the Fellowship of the Academy of Health and Medical Sciences in 2014. In 2020 he was appointed a Member of the Order of Australia for significant service to tertiary education, and to maternal-fetal medicine. He continues to serve on the Board of Research Australia (from 2016) and was recently appointed (2021) as Chair of the Go8 Deputy Vice-Chancellor’s (Research) committee.

Expertise and advocacy 

Fisk’s research area is human fetoplacental disease and its treatment, including fetal stem cells, fetal “pain", and monochorionic (identical) twins. In 2019, Fisk and Michael Gabbett, along with their group, documented the likely genetic basis of semi-identical twins, with identical maternal DNA, but paternal DNA from different sperms. Fisk has published over 300 research papers, and served on the editorial boards of PLoS Medicine and Human Reproduction. As an influential clinician, he is known for promoting the natural caesarean operation, and as an advocate for women’s right to choose their mode of delivery. His research on fetal pain has been used by both sides in the abortion debate.

References

External links 
Who's Who Australia

Biography at UNSW
LinkedIn 

1956 births
Living people
Australian obstetricians
University of Sydney alumni
Alumni of University College London
Alumni of Imperial College London
Academics of University College London
Academic staff of the University of Queensland
Fellows of the Australian Academy of Health and Medical Sciences
Fellows of the Royal College of Obstetricians and Gynaecologists
Fellows of the Royal Society of New South Wales
Academic staff of the University of New South Wales